"Shame and Scandal in the Family", also known as "Shame & Scandal" for short, is a song written by calypso singer Sir Lancelot for the movie I Walked with a Zombie in 1943 and originally titled "Fort Holland Calypso Song". Sir Lancelot issued his recording of it in the late 1940s. The Sir Lancelot version was covered by folksingers Odetta and Burl Ives. In 1962, Trinidadian calypsonian Lord Melody wrote new lyrics for the verses while keeping the melody and the chorus. The Historical Museum of Southern Florida said of Lord Melody's version that "No calypso has been more extensively recorded".

Lyrical content
In Sir Lancelot's version, the lyric reports gossip about a prominent family on a Caribbean island named San Sebastian.

In Lord Melody's 1960s version the story follows a young Puerto Rican man in search of a wife. In each of the verses, the young man asks his father for permission to marry a different woman, only to be told he can not marry the girl as "The girl is your sister, but your mamma don't know". However, the tables are turned during the last verse, where the young man's mother tells him that "Your daddy ain't your daddy, but your daddy don't know", clearing the path for him to marry any of the girls.

The story in Lord Melody's version is identical to that narrated in Robert William Service's poem, Madame La Marquise, from the 1940 collection Bar-Room Ballads. The young French aristocratic Hongray de la Glaciere asks his Papa, the Marquis de la Glaciere, permission to marry Mirabelle de Veau, only to find out that Mirabelle is the illegitimate daughter of the Marquis, and so the marriage between the two young ones would be an incestuous one. Years later, Hongray seeks permission to marry Raymonde de la Veal: but again, Papa reveals that Raymonde is also his illegitimate daughter, and the relationship between the two would be incestuous. Finally, the Mother, the Marquise de la Glaciere, approaches her son in his private room, and she reveals that he may marry either Mirabelle de Veau or Raymonde de la Veal, as Papa the Marquis is not his legitimate father.

Famous covers
In 1962, the Trinidadian calypsonian Lord Melody used Sir Lancelot's song as the basis of his song "Shame and Scandal", although he titled it "Wau, Wau". Melody's version used the same chorus and tune as the original 1943 song but with different verses.
In 1964, Shawn Elliott released it as a single
Also in 1964, The Kingston Trio included a live performance of the song (retitled "Ah Woe, Ah Me!") on their last Capitol Records album Back in Town. 
In 1965, the British comedy actor, Lance Percival, reached number 37 in the UK Singles Chart with his cover version, under the expanded title of "Shame and Scandal in the Family". 
In the mid 1960s, Jamaica's Kingston Hilton Hotel resident mento band, The Hiltonaires, also recorded it as "Shame and Scandal".
In 1965, a ska cover version was recorded in Jamaica by Peter Tosh and The Wailers on vocals, backed by the Skatalites and released on the Studio One label. 
Also in 1965 Los 3 Sudamericanos released a cover in Spanish: "Qué familia más original".
In 1966, French-Italian singer Dalida recorded the song as Un grosso scandalo (with Italian lyrics by Luciano Beretta) for one of her Italian-language LPs on Barclay Records.
In 1969, Odetta performed the song live as a duet with Johnny Cash on The Johnny Cash Show.
In 1970, Trinidadian singer Lord Creator recorded a cover version on his album Big Bamboo.
In 1972, Australian singer, Johnny Chester's version with Jigsaw called "Shame And Scandal (In the Family)" peaked at No. 13 on Go-Set National Top 40.
In 1977, American vocal group The Stylistics released a cover version titled "Shame and Scandal in the Family" from their album, Sun & Soul.  The single reached #87 on the Hot Soul Singles chart.
In 1983, Clint Eastwood & General Saint released a reggae cover version.
In 1993, Skatalà released a cover version titled "Skandol Dub" in the album "Borinot, Borinot".
In 2003, David Lindley and Wally Ingram recorded a version of "Shame and Scandal" on their album "Twango Bango III".  Lindley had previously performed the song a few times in the 80s with his band El Rayo-X.
In 2012, the South African band Dr Victor & the Rasta Rebels released a cover titled "Shame and Scandal" featuring South African singer Kurt Darren.

There are known versions by Trini Lopez, De Maskers, King Bravo with Baba Brooks & his band, Bobby Aitken and Blue Beat, Odetta, Freddie McGregor, Laurel Aitken. Instrumental versions were also popular, most famously by Caravelli and by Franck Pourcel and his Grand Orchestre.

Language versions
The song has been translated to a number of major foreign languages:
French: "Scandale dans la famille" performed by Dalida, by Sacha Distel and by Les Surfs in three separate versions all in 1965. French translated lyrics were by Maurice Tézé
German: "Schande Unserer Familie" performed by Harry & Ronny in 1965
Italian: "Un Grosso Scandalo" performed by Dalida and by Giovanna
Portuguese: "O Escândalo" performed by the Brazilian band Renato e Seus Blue Caps in 1965 and later on by The Supersonics.
Spanish: "Escandalo en la Familia"
Hungarian: "Szégyen és gyalázat a családban" performed by Iván Darvas
Polish: "Skandal w rodzinie (Co za skandal, gdy tata dowie się)" performed by Chochoły
Estonian: "Skandaal perekonnas" performed by Ivo Linna and Rock Hotel
Slovak: "Nervózna família" performed by Jozef Krištof, later band Ventil RG
Greek: "Τι ντροπή" (Ti dropi) (What a shame), performed by Dakis
Hebrew: "Tsarot Ba'Mishpacha" (Troubles in the family), written and performed by Shmulik Kraus
Czech: "Tak či tak" written by Luděk Nekuda and performed by Plavci in 1977

Madness version

British ska/pop band Madness covered the song having previously covered several Prince Buster ska recordings, including the songs "Madness", and "One Step Beyond". The band began performing the song at a series of low-key performances as 'The Dangermen' in 2005.

Madness later recorded the song for their cover album The Dangermen Sessions Vol. 1, and released it as a single later that year.

Formats and track listings
These are the formats and track listings of major single releases of "Shame & Scandal".

7" single
"Shame & Scandal" (Lord/Pinard) - 2:52
"Shame & Scandal [Dub]" (Lord/Pinard) - 2:56
"Shame & Scandal" (Peter Touch (Tosh) and The Wailers) - 3:03

CD single
"Shame & Scandal" (Lord/Pinard) - 2:52
"Skylarking" (Hinds) - 3:02
"Dreader Than Dread" (Galnek) - 3:04

Chart performance
The Madness release did not fare well in the UK, only spending two weeks in the charts, peaking at number 38. However, the song did better in France, where it peaked at number 12 and spent 19 weeks in the charts. The song also made an appearance on the Swiss Singles Top 100, spending 8 weeks in the charts and reaching a high of number 69, and just made the Dutch Singles Top 100, hitting number 100 and remaining in the chart for a single week.

References

External links

Odetta and Johnny Cash sing "Shame and Scandal in the Family" on YouTube (from 1969)

1943 songs
1965 singles
1972 singles
1977 singles
2005 singles
The Stylistics songs
Madness (band) songs
V2 Records singles